= Italy and the International Monetary Fund =

Italy has been a member of the International Monetary Fund (IMF) since 1947, they joined in an effort to revive the economy after WWII. Currently Italy has a 3.02% vote share. Recently IMF have claimed that Italy's proposed budget which has a deficit of 2.4% of their GDP could lead to a recession that would last till the 2020s

== Relationship ==
Italy became a member of the International Monetary Fund (IMF) in 1947 in an effort to revive the economy after World War II. Italy holds a 3.02% vote share within the IMF.

== Italian economy ==
Italy is regarded to have one of the most disastrous economies in the EU but has been recovering at a moderate since 2013. Italian productivity also lags behind most Westernised countries while employees are working more hours than most but producing less since the 1990s. The IMF report discovered that Italy's poor performance was due to excessive regulation and a lack of R&D spending. The nonexistence of a stable governing body in Italy hampers Italy's ability at a significant recovery. Italy has one of the largest debts globally, that hit around 2.3 million Euros. In addition to significant debt Italy also faces a substantial double digit rate of unemployment.

== IMF warnings to Italy ==
=== Budget crisis ===
The IMF has warned that the proposed budget in Italy would create backlash across the EU. In October 2018, Italy's populist government announced that it is targeting a deficit of 2.4% of GDP, which triples the value of the previous administration. The government vows to spend more despite already having a substantial debt. This plan also would push Italy's debt higher that its current level of 130% of its GDP, which more than twice than the EU limit that is 60%. The direction that Italy is currently headed could bring forth another financial crisis and also jeopardises the value of the euro.

=== Danger of a recession ===
The IMF also warned Italy that the passing of their proposed budget could result in a recession that could last until the mid 2020s. Italy's economy has been in turmoil since 2008 and the IMF predicts that at the current growth rate the anti-EU government will prolong Italy in reaching the economic prosperity it had prior to the collapse. Italy has been growing at just around one percent a year since 2016.
